Shapla, Bangla for a type of water lily, may refer to:

BNS Shapla, a ship in the Bangladeshi Navy
Shapla Square, a sculpture in Motijheel, Dhaka, Bangladesh

People with the given name
Shapla Salique (born 1974), British singer

See also
2013 Operation at Motijheel Shapla Chattar, a Hefajat-e Islam protest
Shabla